Otto Husted (October 10, 1902 – March 31, 1980) was a Danish field hockey player who competed in the 1928 Summer Olympics.

He was born in Helsingør and died in Virum. He was the younger brother of Erik Husted.

In 1928 he was a member of the Danish team which was eliminated in the first round of the Olympic tournament after two wins and two losses.  He played three matches as halfback.

External links
 
 profile

1902 births
1980 deaths
Danish male field hockey players
Olympic field hockey players of Denmark
Field hockey players at the 1928 Summer Olympics
People from Helsingør
Sportspeople from the Capital Region of Denmark